Tim Whiffler was an Australian bred Thoroughbred racehorse that won the 1867 Melbourne Cup ridden by jockey John Driscoll.

The 1867 Melbourne Cup included two horses with the name Tim Whiffler.  The winning horse was known as Tim Whiffler Sydney. The other horse was called Tim Whiffler Melbourne.

The owners winning trophy was recently purchased by the National Museum of Australia.

References

External links
 Tim Whiffler's pedigree Pedigree online Thoroughbred Database

Melbourne Cup winners
1862 racehorse births
Racehorses bred in Australia
Racehorses trained in Australia
Thoroughbred family 4-b